Megacrioceratinae is an extinct ammonoid cephalopod subfamily. It has been described as family Megacrioceratidae in 2006, but later changed into subfamily under its current name. Ammonites belonging to this subfamily lived from Plesiospitidiscus ligatus zone of Upper Hauterivian until Avramidiscus kiliani zone of Lower Barremian.

Genera

 Garroniceras
 Megacrioceras
 Bastelia
 Liautaudia

References

Early Cretaceous ammonites
Hauterivian life
Barremian life
Ancyloceratoidea